This is a list of partial differential equation topics.

General topics

Partial differential equation
 Nonlinear partial differential equation
list of nonlinear partial differential equations
Boundary condition
Boundary value problem
Dirichlet problem, Dirichlet boundary condition
Neumann boundary condition
Stefan problem
Wiener–Hopf problem
Separation of variables
Green's function
Elliptic partial differential equation
Singular perturbation
Cauchy–Kovalevskaya theorem
H-principle
Atiyah–Singer index theorem
Bäcklund transform
Viscosity solution
Weak solution
Loewy decomposition of linear differential equations

Specific partial differential equations

Broer–Kaup equations
Burgers' equation
Euler equations
Fokker–Planck equation
Hamilton–Jacobi equation, Hamilton–Jacobi–Bellman equation
Heat equation
Laplace's equation
Laplace operator
Harmonic function
Spherical harmonic
Poisson integral formula
Klein–Gordon equation
Korteweg–de Vries equation
Modified KdV–Burgers equation
Maxwell's equations
Navier–Stokes equations
Poisson's equation
Primitive equations (hydrodynamics)
Schrödinger equation
Wave equation

Numerical methods for PDEs

Finite difference
Finite element method
Finite volume method
Boundary element method
Multigrid
Spectral method
Computational fluid dynamics
Alternating direction implicit

Related areas of mathematics

 Calculus of variations
 Harmonic analysis
 Ordinary differential equation
 Sobolev space

 
Partial differential equations